Third Harvest are a progressive rock or metal band from Keady in County Armagh in Northern Ireland. The current lineup consists of Paddy Mallon (lead singer and guitarist), Damo Brown (bass and backup vocals) and Pearse Donnelly (drums and backup vocals). They are currently playing shows in Northern Ireland, mainly in Belfast.

History
Third Harvest formed in mid-February 2008 when frontman Paddy found two other similar musicians who had the same musical ambition and passion. Paddy had worked with Damo on previous projects and were long time friends and after searching for a short while, they found Pearse a friend of the band whose own band split up recently. A strong friendship between the band members meant they bonded quickly and a natural chemistry appeared between them. They then agreed on the name Third Harvest in April 2008. After their formation they created a 6-song self-produced EP between them.

E.P. and Armagh Battle of the Bands
In July 2009, Third Harvest entered the Einstein Studios to record a new, fresh, three-track EP. This received quite good reviews, like from Scott from Fast Fury Promotions, ' This band just makes you watch and watch and watch. Their new E.P. has three tremendous tracks on it and I suggest you get yourself a copy ' and professional critics like Jonathan Long from Rocksound  Magazine:
 - Jonathan Long 
Third Harvest also won the Armagh Battle of the Bands in 2009 at the Northern Bands and are highly credited as an upcoming band because of this.

References

Irish alternative rock groups